"Honey" is a popular song written by Seymour Simons, Haven Gillespie and Richard A. Whiting. The song was a 1929 hit for Rudy Vallée & his Connecticut Yankees and another popular version was by Ben Selvin.
It was also featured in the 1945 film Her Highness and the Bellboy.

Many other artists have recorded the song over the years.

References

1929 songs
Songs with music by Richard A. Whiting
Songs with lyrics by Haven Gillespie
Songs written by Seymour Simons